The University of Indianapolis (UIndy) is a private United Methodist Church-affiliated university in Indianapolis, Indiana. It offers Associate, Bachelor's, Master's, and Doctoral degrees. It was founded in 1902 as Indiana Central University and was popularly known as Indiana Central College from 1921 until 1975. In 1986 the name was changed to University of Indianapolis.

The main campus is located on the south side of Indianapolis at 1400 East Hanna Avenue, just east of Shelby Street. The campus straddles the Carson Heights and University Heights neighborhoods of Indianapolis. UIndy's international sites include joint programs with Ningbo Institute of Technology, Zhejiang University (China) and Zhejiang Yuexiu University of Foreign Languages (China), and an articulation agreement with University of Nicosia (Cyprus). Previous international sites included the Galen University in Belize.

The university's colors are crimson and gray. Its athletic teams, known as the Greyhounds, are members of the Great Lakes Valley Conference (GLVC) in the NCAA Division II.

History

In the early 20th century William L. Elder, an Indianapolis real estate developer, offered the Church of the United Brethren in Christ eight acres of real estate southeast of downtown Indianapolis to establish a college in exchange for help selling 446 parcels of land around the donated acreage. Indiana Central University was chartered in 1902, but instruction did not start until September 26, 1905, when the first building, Good Hall, was completed.

The school opened with three divisions and eight departments. The three divisions included the academy, which offered high school courses; the normal school, which provided a two-year program of teacher education; and the liberal arts college. The departments included the College of Liberal Arts, Teachers’ College, Conservatory of Music, School of Oratory, School of Commerce, Bible Institute, School of Arts, and the academy, in which students completed their preparatory work and earned high school diplomas.

While established as Indiana Central University (ICU), the school was colloquially known as Indiana Central College (ICC) from 1921 to 1975. The North Central Association of Schools and Colleges accredited the university in March 1947. Academic administration was restructured to group programs into colleges and schools, and the institution returned to using the Indiana Central University name from 1976 to 1986. The initials "ICU" can still be seen in brick on the front side of Krannert Memorial Library on campus. In 1986, the university adopted the name University of Indianapolis.

Presidents
J. T. Roberts, 1905–1908
L. D. Bonebrake, 1909–1915
I. J. Good, 1915–1944
I. Lynd Esch, 1945–1970
Gene E. Sease, 1970–1988
G. Benjamin Lantz, Jr., 1988–1998
Jerry M. Israel, 1998–2005
Beverley J. Pitts, 2005–2012
Robert L. Manuel, 2012–2022

Academics

Schools and colleges
The University of Indianapolis offers 82 undergraduate majors leading to either a bachelor's degree (four-year program) or an associate degree (two-year program). Students may also enroll in several pre-professional programs, twenty-seven master's degree programs, and five doctoral degrees. The university is organized into the following schools and colleges:

School of Business
School of Education
School of Nursing
School of Occupational Therapy
Krannert School of Physical Therapy
R.B. Annis School of Engineering
College of Applied Behavioral Sciences
Health Sciences
Shaheen College of Arts & Sciences

Centers and institutes
UIndy has the following centers and institutes:
Center for Aging & Community (CAC)
Center of Excellence in Leadership of Learning (CELL)
Professional Edge Center
Richard G. Lugar Academy
Institute for Civic Leadership & Mayoral Archives
Center for Business Partnerships
Institute for Leadership & Professional Development
The Institute for Postindustrial Leadership

Rankings and recognition

UIndy is ranked in the top tier of Midwest universities by U.S. News & World Report. As of 2018, the university was ranked #34 (tie) in Regional Universities Midwest, #21 (tie) in Best Colleges for Veterans, and #66 in Best Value Schools.

Admissions statistics

For fall 2014, UIndy received 5,313 freshmen applications; 4,486 were admitted (84%) and 830 enrolled. For enrolled freshmen, the middle 50% range of SAT scores were 450 - 550 for critical reading, 460 - 560 for math, and 440 - 540 for writing. The middle 50% range of the ACT scores were 19 - 25 for composite, 19 - 26 for math, and 19 - 25 for English.

Student life

Enrollment statistics
, UIndy had about  5,550 students on its main campus, of which 1,500 were graduate students.

, the student body was 64 percent female and 36 percent male. The student body was 70% White/Non-Hispanic, 9% Black/African-American, 4% Hispanic/Latino, 1% Asian. 44 U.S. states and 68 countries are represented among students on campus. Nine percent of undergraduates and nearly seven percent of graduate students are international students. Overall, 25 percent international and minority enrollment. Over 90% of the students attending the University of Indianapolis come from within the state of Indiana. 57% of undergraduate students are in the 18 to 22 age bracket.

Media

The Reflector is the University of Indianapolis's student newspaper. The student-run serial publication has over 100 years of uninterrupted reporting on campus and today operates online. The first issue was published on November 15, 1922.

WICR (88.7) is an 8,000 watt, Class B public radio station at the University of Indianapolis that broadcasts to listeners in the Indianapolis metropolitan area. It is a campus radio station. The station began broadcasting in 1962 with ten watts of power.

WIX (UIndy TV) is a student television station. Students produce news and entertainment programming for distribution on campus cable channel 5 and on the Comcast and Bright House Networks in Marion County, Indiana. The University of Indianapolis was named Indiana Association of School Broadcasters TV School of the Year in 2008.

Etchings Press is the UIndy's teaching press and publishing laboratory. Students produce Etchings Literary and Fine Arts Magazine bi-annually, which celebrated its 30th birthday in 2018. The students also judge the Whirling Prize each fall for books published in the past two years that respond to the contest theme and publish three books each spring through Etchings Press' Chapbook and Novella Prize.

Campus

Smith Mall
The most prominent physical feature of the campus was the central parking lot which was framed by a quadrangle of buildings. In 1998 the University of Indianapolis hired Odle McGuire Shook to re-purpose the 5.2 acres into green space and later named the area Smith Mall. The mall is made up of a circular sunken lawn, a recessed long canal, water gardens, and the partial arc of an amphitheater. 80 bald cypresses were planted as part of the project.

Academic buildings

Christel DeHaan Fine Arts Center
Esch Hall
Good Hall
Krannert Memorial Library
Lilly Science Hall
Martin Hall
Schwitzer Student Center
R.B. Annis Hall (School of Engineering)
Ruth Lilly Fitness Center
Stierwalt Alumni House
UIndy Health Pavilion

Residential buildings

Greyhound Village Apartments
University Lofts
Cory Bretz Hall
Central Hall
Crowe Hall
East Hall
Cravens Hall
Roberts Hall
Warren Hall

Athletics facilities

Athletics & Recreation Center (ARC)
Baumgartner Field
Greyhound Park
Kiesel Field at Key Stadium
Skillman Court at Nicoson Hall
Tennis Center

Safety
The University of Indianapolis Police Department is a campus police force that oversees security. UIndy employs a full-time chief and full-time officers, all certified by the Indiana Law Enforcement Academy. Officers have full arrest powers and are licensed to carry firearms. They enforce all local and state laws, in addition to university regulations.

Athletics

The University of Indianapolis's athletic teams are known as the Greyhounds and participate in Division II of the NCAA. Most of the teams are members of the Great Lakes Valley Conference. The school's highest finish in the NACDA Directors' Cup was 3rd in 2021–22. UIndy finished in the top 20 14 consecutive years through 2022, including nine top 10s in that span.

The mascot is a greyhound named "Ace." The university's song, called simply the "U of I Fight Song," was written in 1975 by James M. Stanton, at the time an Indiana Central senior. The lyrics were rewritten when the university changed its name in 1986. In 2006, the cheerleaders changed the "U of I" portions of the song to "UIndy" to reflect the preferred shortened name of the school.

Notable alumni
Harold Achor (1928) – Justice of the Indiana Supreme Court.
Jon Ackerson – former member of both houses of the Kentucky State Legislature; lawyer in Louisville, Kentucky
Brian Barnhart (1983) – current president of Harding Steinbrenner Racing and former president of Race Operations for IndyCar.
Craig Bowden (1990) – current PGA-tour golfer; 8 wins on Nationwide Tour and lower tours.
George Crowe (1943) – first Indiana "Mr. Basketball"; played nine years in MLB, earning a spot on the National League All-Star team in 1958.
Ray Crowe (1938) – coached the Crispus Attucks High School basketball team that won Indiana state championships in 1955 and 1956, becoming the first African-American team in the nation to claim a state title.
David "Big Dave" DeJernett (1935) – First African-American to lead an integrated team to a state title, in 1930, and then led the integrated ICC Greyhounds to the (mythical) Indiana college conference championship in 1934, finishing ahead of Notre Dame and Purdue with a 16–1 record. Played professional basketball for the historic Chicago Crusaders, Harlem Globetrotters, and New York Renaissance clubs.
Adam Driver - actor known for playing Kylo Ren in the Star Wars sequel trilogy (attended; transferred to Juilliard School).
Irene Dunne (1918 - Conservatory of Music) - actress 
Stephane Fortin – former Canadian Football League player.
Matt Kohn (2005) – American Arena Football League player.
David Logan (2005) – basketball player for Maccabi Tel Aviv.
Megan Meadors – 2008 Miss Indiana.
William Raspberry (1958) – a columnist for The Washington Post and a Pulitzer Prize winner.
Irwin Sparkes and Alphonso Sharland – Guitar front man and drummer from popular London rock band The Hoosiers.
Walter Spencer (2004) – linebacker for the Montreal Alouettes of the CFL, winner of the 2009 Grey Cup.
Katie R. Stam Irk – 2009 Miss America.
Andrew Werner (2009) – debuted as an MLB pitcher in 2012, playing for the San Diego Padres. Currently playing in the Oakland Athletics organization.

References

External links
 

 
Universities and colleges in Indianapolis
Educational institutions established in 1902
Universities and colleges affiliated with the United Methodist Church
University of Indianapolis
1902 establishments in Indiana